Katarína Filová (born 14 May 1989 in Bratislava) is a Slovak swimmer, who specializes in sprint freestyle events. She is a multiple-time Slovak freestyle relay record holder, and a two-time 2013 Atlantic Coast Conference team champion. Filova is also a resident athlete for J&T Sport Team Bratislava, and is coached and trained by Gabriel Baran.

Filova qualified for two swimming events at the 2012 Summer Olympics in London, by achieving the FINA B-standard entry times of 55.66 (100 m freestyle) and 2:01.02 (200 m freestyle) at the Grand Prix Slovakia in her home city Bratislava. In the 200 m freestyle, Filova challenged seven other swimmers in the second heat, including former Olympic champion Camelia Potec of Romania. Swimming in lane eight, Filova edged out Austria's Jördis Steinegger to pick up sixth spot and twenty-eighth overall by 0.36 of a second in 2:02.03. In her second event, 100 m freestyle, Filova pulled off another sixth-place finish in heat four, a quarter of a second (0.25) behind Olympic breaststroke champion Rūta Meilutytė of Lithuania in a time of 56.58. Filova failed to advance into the semifinals, as she placed thirty-first overall out of 48 swimmers in the preliminaries.

Filova is currently a fourth-year junior with an international studies major at Virginia Tech in Blacksburg, Virginia. She is also one of two Slovak athletes, alongside hammer thrower Marcel Lomnický, who train for the Virginia Tech Hokies under head coach Ned Skinner.

References

External links
Player Bio – Virginia Tech Hokies
NBC Olympics Profile

1989 births
Living people
Slovak female swimmers
Olympic swimmers of Slovakia
Swimmers at the 2012 Summer Olympics
Slovak female freestyle swimmers
Sportspeople from Bratislava
Virginia Tech Hokies women's swimmers
20th-century Slovak women
21st-century Slovak women